Lesbates is a genus of longhorn beetles of the subfamily Lamiinae, containing the following species:

 Lesbates acromii (Dalman, 1823)
 Lesbates axillaris (Thomson, 1860)
 Lesbates carissima Dillon & Dillon, 1945
 Lesbates caviunas (Dillon & Dillon, 1949)

References

Onciderini